Mesonerilla prospera is a species of invertebrate in the Nerillidae family endemic to Bermuda.
In 2000, M. prospera was put on the IUCN Red List under the critically endangered category. The IUCN states that "there are problems with the Order name and the correct placement of the family."

References 

Polychaetes
Endemic fauna of Bermuda
Animals described in 1982
Taxonomy articles created by Polbot